Efstathios Katsikogiannis was a Hellenic Army officer who reached the rank of major general.

He was born in Athens in 1869, to a family of armatoloi of the Valtos region. He was commissioned an artillery officer in the Hellenic Army, and fought in the Greco-Turkish War of 1897, the Balkan Wars of 1912–13, and the Greco-Turkish War of 1919–1922, where he commanded the 11th Infantry Division.

He retired, on his own request, with the rank of major general, on 7/20 December 1922.

References

1869 births
20th-century deaths
19th-century Greek military personnel
20th-century Greek military personnel
Greek military personnel of the Balkan Wars
Greek military personnel of the Greco-Turkish War (1897)
Greek military personnel of the Greco-Turkish War (1919–1922)
Hellenic Army major generals
Military personnel from Athens